Gordon Maynard Craig (August 1, 1929 – September 10, 1950) was a soldier in the United States Army during the Korean War. He posthumously received the Medal of Honor for his actions on September 10, 1950, during the Battle of Ka-san.

Awards and decorations

Medal of Honor citation
Rank and organization: Corporal, U.S. Army, 16th Reconnaissance Company, 1st Cavalry Division

Place and date: Near Kasan, Korea September 10, 1950

Entered service at: Brockton, Mass. Born: August 1, 1929, Brockton, Mass.

G.O. No.: 23, April 25, 1951. 

Citation:

Cpl. Craig, 16th Reconnaissance Company, distinguished himself by conspicuous gallantry and intrepidity above and beyond the call of duty in action against the enemy. During the attack on a strategic enemy-held hill his company's advance was subjected to intense hostile grenade, mortar and small-arms fire. Cpl. Craig and 4 comrades moved forward to eliminate an enemy machine gun nest that was hampering the company's advance. At that instance an enemy machine gunner hurled a hand grenade at the advancing men. Without hesitating or attempting to seek cover for himself, Cpl. Craig threw himself on the grenade and smothered its burst with his body. His intrepid and selfless act, in which he unhesitantly gave his life for his comrades, inspired them to attack with such ferocity that they annihilated the enemy machine gun crew, enabling the company to continue its attack. Cpl. Craig's noble self-sacrifice reflects the highest credit upon himself and upholds the esteemed traditions of the military service.

See also
List of Medal of Honor recipients
List of Korean War Medal of Honor recipients

Notes

References

1929 births
1950 deaths
United States Army Medal of Honor recipients
American military personnel killed in the Korean War
United States Army non-commissioned officers
People from Brockton, Massachusetts
Korean War recipients of the Medal of Honor
Deaths by hand grenade
United States Army personnel of the Korean War